Swakopmund Airport  is a non-towered airport serving Swakopmund, a city in the Erongo Region of Namibia. There are no runway lights.

Activities at Swakopmund Airfield
There are numerous charter companies operating in and out of Swakopmund on a daily basis. There is a private Aircraft Maintenance Operation for piston and turbine aircraft at the airfield.

See also
List of airports in Namibia
Transport in Namibia

References

External links
OurAirports - Swakopmund
OpenStreetMap - Swakopmund
Swakopmund Helicopter Charter

Airports in Namibia
Swakopmund
Buildings and structures in Erongo Region